Lee Nye (1926 – November 11, 1999) was an American photographer best known for his series of photographs entitled Eddie's Club Collection that documents Missoula, Montana's working class inhabitants.

Nye was born in Hysham, Montana, in 1926. He attended high school in Butte where his father worked for the Northern Pacific Railway. Nye quit high school at 17 and worked as a cowboy until he later joined the United States Navy. In 1950 he moved to California and studied photography at the Brooks Institute of Photography. In the following years, Nye worked as a photographer in Los Angeles and New Orleans covering theater, movie still photography, news, fashion and portraiture. He was awarded two prizes in 1953 by Photography Magazine for his photographs "Sunday Morning" and "The Bath."

His work has been exhibited throughout the US and Europe. His photographs have appeared in Photography, Dance Magazine, Playboy, Art News, American Craft, and Montana Magazine.

Exhibitions
Transitions in the Nude: 1950–1999; The Montana Museum of Art and Culture, November 9, 2004 – January 31, 2005

External links
 Information from the printed pamphlet for Transitions in the Nude: 1950-1999
 Nye Imagery

1926 births
1999 deaths
People from Hysham, Montana
20th-century American photographers
Artists from Montana
United States Navy sailors